The Extraordinary and Plenipotentiary Ambassador of Peru to the Bolivarian Republic of Venezuela is the official representative of the Republic of Peru to the Bolivarian Republic of Venezuela.

Relations between both countries were established in 1853, and relations have been continued since, although relations have twice been frozen (but never severed): in 2001, over a dispute regarding the extradition of Vladimiro Montesinos, and in 2017, when Peru recalled its ambassador and expelled its Venezuelan counterpart.

List of representatives

See also
List of ambassadors of Peru to Ecuador
List of ambassadors of Peru to Colombia
List of ambassadors of Peru to Trinidad and Tobago

References

Venezuela
Peru